"" (English: "Oh, Uncle Waiari"), also known as ""  is a traditional Māori song, often used in tītī tōrea, a type of whakaraka (skill and dexterity game) played by passing tītī (40-60cm long sticks) while seated, in time to a rhythmic song.

The song became a staple for Māori musicians to record, including St Joseph's Māori Girls' College Choir Turakina Maori Girls' College Choir in the 1960s. In 1985, the Pātea Māori Club released the song as a reggae pop single, and the New Zealand band Herbs recorded the song as the opening track to their album Sensitive to a Smile in (1987), also in a reggae style.

Background 

The origins of the song are not definitively known, however they may come from a late 19th Century/early 20th Century Whanganui River tradition, where marae along the river would create their own lyrics to the song for competitions. The song and tītī tōrea became popular to be used was used by the Girl Scouts of the USA.

The first mention in print of the song is as a part of a set-list by a Māori performance group from Puketeraki (near Dunedin) being broadcast on the radio in April 1933.

Pātea Māori Club version 

The Pātea Māori Club released a Pacific reggae/reggae pop version of the song as their fourth single in late 1985, entitled "E Papa". During their 1984/1985 tour of the United Kingdom, the club performed the song on the UK children's television show Blue Peter. The song peaked at number 41 in New Zealand, and an extended version was included in their 1987 debut album Poi E.

Background

Dalvanius was inspired to recreate the traditional song as reggae pop. The club performed the song during their 1984/1985 tour of the United Kingdom on the children's television programme Blue Peter, due to the stick game associated with the song. During the tour, lyricist and mentor to the club's producer Dalvanius Prime passed away in late January, when the band had half-completed their album. Dalvanius was deeply affected by this loss, feeling creatively exhausted, unable to write songs without her and unable to record in the studio. Despite this, the band recorded "E Papa" on return to Auckland in February 1985. Fred Faleauto and Dilworth Karaka, members of the Pacific reggae band Herbs, performed on the track.

The song was released as a single in late 1985. The song debuted at number 48 on the Official New Zealand Music Chart in November, however peaked the next week at 41. The single spent a total of eight weeks charting in the top 50 singles. A version entitled "E Papa Waiari" was featured on their 1987 album Poi E, which featured an extended stick outro.

Track listing

NZ 7-inch single
"E Papa (Part 1)"  – 3:30
"E Papa (Part 2)" Vocal Instrumental  – 3:37
"E Papa (Part 3)" U.K. Club Mix  – 5:24
"Hei Konei Ra (Farewell)"  – 3:10

NZ 7-inch single
"E Papa (Part 1)"  – 3:35
"E Papa (Part 2)" Vocal Instrumental  – 3:37

Credits and personnel
Credits adapted from the Poi E album booklet.

Greg Carroll – rakau percussion
Fred Faleauto – rakau percussion
Victor Grbic – mixing, rakau percussion
Dave Hurley – engineering, co-production
Steve Foot Kanuta – rakau percussion
Wiremu Karaitiana – Emulator II synthesizer, additional arrangement
Dilworth Karaka – guitar
Carl Levy – arranger
Bill Millett – rakau percussion
Les Palmer – arranger
Stuart Pearce – keyboard, additional arrangement
Dalvanius Prime – co-arranger, producer

Charts

Other recorded versions 

St Joseph's Māori Girls' College Choir on Maori Songs of Enchantment (1961) as "E Papa Wairangi"
Turakina Maori Girls' College Choir on The Maori Girls of Turakina (1967), as "E Papa Waiari (Stick Game)"
Herbs on Sensitive to a Smile (1987), as "E Papa". Recorded in a pop-reggae style similar to Pātea Māori Club
Kiri Te Kanawa on Maori Songs (1999), as "E Papa (Titi Torca/E Aue)"
Lizzie Marvelly on Home (2011)
George “Fiji” Veikoso on “Born and Raised” (1996)

References

1985 singles
19th-century songs
Māori-language songs
New Zealand children's songs
New Zealand folk songs
New Zealand songs
Pātea Māori Club songs
Herbs (band) songs
Song recordings produced by Dalvanius Prime